The Maikulan were an indigenous Australian people of the state of Queensland. They have sometimes been confused with the Maithakari.

Name
According to an earlier resident of the area, the tribal autonym referred to the native brushturkey.

Country
Their eastern boundary lay near the Gregory Range, while the western frontier was at Iffley and Canobie.

History of contact
With the onset of white settlement, the tribe's demographic statistics suggested an original population of some 400 people. Within two decades, the numbers had been halved, with 200 remaining, as a result of what one observer stated was 'the rifle and syphilis'. A branch of the Maikulan soon shifted down the Norman River to settle around Normanton, which misled some early reports to take them to be indigenous to the latter area.

Alternative names
 Maikulung, Maikolon
 Makulu
 Mygoolan, Mykoolan, Mycoolon, Micoolan, Miccoolin, Mikkoolan, Mikoolun
 Mykulau. (typo)

Source:

Some words
 meekoolan. (whiteman)
 mirage. (mother)
 . (father)
 . (wild/tame dog)

Source:

Notes

Citations

Sources

Aboriginal peoples of Queensland